Arani Sari is a traditional sari made in Arani, Tamil Nadu, India. A sari is a strip of unstitched cloth, ranging from four yards to nine yards in length. Saris, derived from the Sanskrit word Saadi, have been described in Tamilian literature as early as the 5th or 6th centuries.

Geographical indication rights
Arani sari received  Intellectual Property Rights Protection or Geographical Indication (GI) status.

References

Saris
Geographical indications in Tamil Nadu